This is a list of diplomatic missions of Sudan, excluding honorary consulates.

Africa

 Algiers (Embassy)

 Luanda (Embassy)

 Yaoundé (Embassy)

 Bangui (Embassy)

 N'Djamena (Embassy)

 Moroni (Embassy)

 Kinshasa (Embassy)

 Djibouti (Embassy)

 Cairo (Embassy)
 Aswan (Consulate-General)

 Asmara (Embassy)

 Addis Ababa (Embassy)

 Accra (Embassy)

 Abidjan (Embassy)

 Nairobi (Embassy)

 Tripoli (Embassy)

 Nouakchott (Embassy)

 Rabat (Embassy)

 Maputo (Embassy)

 Lagos (Embassy)

 Kigali (Embassy)

 Dakar (Embassy)

 Mogadishu (Embassy)

 Pretoria (Embassy)

 Juba (Embassy)

 Dar es Salaam (Embassy)

 Tunis (Embassy)

 Kampala (Embassy)
 Gulu (Consulate-General)

 Lusaka (Embassy)

 Harare (Embassy)

Americas

 Brasilia (Embassy)

 Ottawa (Embassy)

 Washington, D.C. (Embassy)
 New York City (Consulate-General)

 Caracas (Embassy)

Asia

 Baku (Embassy)

 Manama (Embassy)

 Beijing (Embassy)

 New Delhi (Embassy)

 Jakarta (Embassy)

 Baghdad (Embassy)

 Tokyo (Embassy)

 Amman (Embassy)

 Kuwait City (Embassy)

 Beirut (Embassy)

 Kuala Lumpur (Embassy)

 Muscat (Embassy)

 Islamabad (Embassy)

 Doha (Embassy)

 Riyadh (Embassy)
 Jeddah (Consulate-General)

 Seoul (Embassy)

 Damascus (Embassy)

 Bangkok (Embassy)

 Ankara (Embassy)
 Istanbul (Consulate-General)

 Abu Dhabi (Embassy)
 Dubai (Consulate-General)

 San'a' (Embassy)

Europe

 Vienna (Embassy)

 Minsk (Embassy)

 Brussels (Embassy)

 Prague (Embassy)

 Paris (Embassy)

 Berlin (Embassy)

 Athens (Embassy)

 Budapest (Embassy)

 Dublin (Embassy)

 Rome (Embassy)

 The Hague (Embassy)

 Oslo (Embassy)

 Bucharest (Embassy)

 Moscow (Embassy)

 Madrid (Embassy)

 Stockholm (Embassy)

 Kyiv (Embassy)

 London (Embassy)

Oceania

 Canberra (Embassy)

Multilateral organisations
 African Union
Addis Ababa (Permanent Mission to the African Union)

Brussels (Mission to the European Union)

Geneva (Permanent Mission to the United Nations and other international organizations)
New York (Permanent Mission to the United Nations)
Nairobi (Permanent Mission to the United Nations and other international organizations)
Vienna (Permanent Mission the United Nations)

Paris (Permanent Mission to UNESCO)

Gallery

Closed missions

Africa

Asia

Europe

See also
 Foreign relations of Sudan
 List of diplomatic missions in Sudan
 Visa policy of Sudan

References

 
Diplomatic missions
Sudan